This article contains information about the literary events and publications of 1708.

Events
July 14 – Joseph Trapp becomes the first Oxford Professor of Poetry.
unknown date – Edward Lhuyd becomes a Fellow of the Royal Society.

New books

Prose
Joseph Addison – The Present State of the War (pro-Marlborough tract)
Francis Atterbury – Fourteen Sermons Preach'd on Several Occasions
Joseph Bingham – Origines Ecclesiasticae, or Antiquities of the Christian Church, vol. 1
Laurent Bordelon – Mital; ou Aventures incroyables
Elizabeth Burnet – A Method of Devotion
Jeremy Collier – An Ecclesiastical History of Great Britain, Chiefly of England, vol. 1
Ebenezer Cooke – The Sot-Weed Factor
Anthony Ashley Cooper, 3rd Earl of Shaftesbury – A Letter Concerning Enthusiasm (opposing radical Protestantism)
Edmund Curll – The Charitable Surgeon
Anne Dacier (Anne Lefèvre) – Homer's Odyssey (prose, first translation into French)
John Downes – Roscius Anglicanus (historical review of the stage)
John Fisher, Cardinal Bishop of Rochester (executed 1535) – Funeral Sermon for Margaret, Countess of Richmond and Derby (originally delivered 1509; published with an anonymous preface by Thomas Baker)
John Gay – Wine
Charles Gildon
Libertas Triumphans (re Battle of Oudenarde)
The New Metamorphosis (fiction)
John Harris – Lexicon Technicum: Or, A Universal English Dictionary of Arts and Sciences, vol. 1 (2nd edition)
Aaron Hill & Nahum Tate – The Celebrated Speeches of Ajax and Ulysses, for the Armour of Achilles (from Ovid)
Benjamin Hoadly – The Unhappiness of the Present Establishment, and the Unhappiness of Absolute Monarchy
Anne de La Roche-Guilhem – La Foire de Beaucaire
François Leguat – Voyage et avantures de François Leguat et de ses compagnons, en deux isles désertes des Indes orientales (A new voyage to the East-Indies)
John Locke (died 1704) – Some Familiar Letters
Simon Ockley – The Conquest of Syria, Persia, and Aegypt by the Saracens (vol. 1 of History of the Saracens)
John Oldmixon – The British Empire in America
Jonathan Swift
Predictions for the Year 1708
The Accomplishment of the First of Mr. Bickerstaff's Predictions (together with part of the "Bickerstaff Papers")
An Argument against Abolishing Christianity

Drama
Thomas Baker – The Fine Lady's Airs (first performed December 18)
Charles Goring – Irene
Peter Anthony Motteux – Love's Triumph (opera)
Nicholas Rowe – The Royal Convert
William Taverner – The Disappointment
Lewis Theobald – The Persian Princess

Poetry

Richard Blackmore – The Kit-Cats
Elijah Fenton – Oxford and Cambridge Miscellany Poems
William King – The Art of Cookery (poem)
Matthew Prior – Poems on Several Occasions (see also 1707)

Births
April 23 – Friedrich von Hagedorn, German poet (died 1754)
July 8 – Claude-Henri de Fusée de Voisenon, French dramatist (died 1775)
August 29 – Olof von Dalin, Swedish poet (died 1763)
September 2 – André le Breton, French publisher (died 1779)
October 16 – Albrecht von Haller, Swiss biologist and poet (died 1777)
unknown dates
Richard Dawes, English classical scholar (died 1766)
Thomas Seward, English poet (died 1790)

Deaths
January 1 – Johannes Kelpius, German polymath (born 1673)
March 4 – Thomas Ward, English Catholic writer (born 1652)
March 5 – Charles Le Gobien, French Jesuit writer (born 1653)
March 15 – William Walsh, English poet and critic (born 1662)
October 11 – Ehrenfried Walther von Tschirnhaus, German philosopher (born 1651)
October 21
Kata Szidónia Petrőczy, Hungarian Baroque writer (born 1659)
Christian Weise, German dramatist and poet (born 1642)
October 22 – Hermann Witsius, Dutch theologian (born 1636)
November 15 – Gregory Hascard, English religious writer and cleric (year of birth unknown)
unknown date – Nikolai Spathari (Nicolae Milescu), Moldavian travel writer and diplomat (born 1636)

References

 
Years of the 18th century in literature